Maxime Cam (born 9 July 1992) is a French professional racing cyclist, who currently rides for French club team E.C. Landerneau.

Major results
2010
 2nd Ronde des Vallées
2014
 5th Overall Kreiz Breizh Elites
2017
 5th Overall Tour de Bretagne Cycliste
 6th Paris–Chauny
2019
 3rd Overall Kreiz Breizh Elites

References

External links
 

1992 births
Living people
French male cyclists
People from Landerneau
Sportspeople from Finistère
Cyclists from Brittany